Susan Beth Scott (born in Cape Girardeau, Missouri), is an American Paralympic swimmer.

She competed at World Championships in 2006 in South Africa, before moving to the Olympic Training Center to swim for Jimi Flowers. Her first Games participation was at the Beijing 2008 Paralympics where she won a bronze medal for 400 m freestyle and the same year became ESPY Award nominee for being the Best Female Athlete with a Disability. In 2009, Scott held a World record in 1500 m freestyle and next year won one golds for 34 point medley at 2010 World Championships. At the same place she also got a silver medal for 400 metre freestyle and a bronze one for 100 m  backstroke. Couple of years later she received a silver and two bronze medals for her participation at 2012 Summer Paralympics in London. When she was 7 months old she was diagnosed with spina bifida and underwent surgery. Four years later she needed further surgery. At age 11 and 12 she participated in the 50-metre freestyle at the Central Municipal Pool where she finished twelfth and finished tenth in 800-metre freestyle as well.

References

Sportspeople from Cape Girardeau, Missouri
Paralympic swimmers of the United States
Paralympic bronze medalists for the United States
Paralympic silver medalists for the United States
World record holders in paralympic swimming
Swimmers at the 2008 Summer Paralympics
Swimmers at the 2012 Summer Paralympics
American female backstroke swimmers
American female medley swimmers
Living people
Year of birth missing (living people)
Medalists at the 2008 Summer Paralympics
Medalists at the 2012 Summer Paralympics
American sportswomen
S10-classified Paralympic swimmers
People with spina bifida
Medalists at the World Para Swimming Championships
Paralympic medalists in swimming
21st-century American women